The 2014 Men's EuroHockey Junior Championship III was the ninth edition of the Men's EuroHockey Junior Championship III, the third level of the men's European under-21 field hockey championships organized by the European Hockey Federation. It was held from 20 to 26 July 2014 in Hradec Králové, Czech Republic.

Turkey won their first EuroHockey Junior Championship III title and were promoted to the 2017 Men's EuroHockey Junior Championship II together with the runners-up and hosts the Czech Republic.

Results

Standings

Matches

See also
2014 Men's EuroHockey Junior Championship II

References

Men's EuroHockey Junior Championship III
Junior 3
International field hockey competitions hosted by the Czech Republic
Sport in Hradec Králové
EuroHockey Junior Championship III
EuroHockey Junior Championship III
EuroHockey Junior Championship III